Balbisia is a genus of flowering plants belonging to the family Francoaceae. It is also in the Vivianiaceae subfamily.

The genus is distributed across is Argentina, Bolivia, Chile and Peru in southern South America.

Known species
As accepted by Kew;

The genus name of Balbisia is in honour of Giovanni Battista Balbis (1772–1840), an Italian botanist and politician who worked in Italy and France.. It was first described and published in Anales Ci. Nat. Vol.7 on page 62 in 1804.

The genus is recognized by the United States Department of Agriculture and the Agricultural Research Service, but they do not list any known species.

References

Francoaceae
Geraniales genera
Plants described in 1804
Flora of Bolivia
Flora of southern South America
Taxa named by Antonio José Cavanilles